Gerhard Kubik (born 10 December 1934) is an Austrian music ethnologist from Vienna. He studied ethnology, musicology and African languages at the University of Vienna.  He published his doctoral dissertation in 1971 and achieved habilitation in 1980.

Biography 
Kubik has been carrying out research in Africa for every year since 1958. Since then, he has published over 300 articles and books on Africa and African-Americans, based on his field work in fifteen African countries, in Venezuela and Brazil. Kubik's topics are music and dance, oral traditions and traditional systems of education, the extension of African culture to the Americas (especially Brazil) and the linguistics of the Bantu languages of central Africa. Moreover, Kubik has compiled the largest collection of African traditional music worldwide, with over 25,000 recordings, mostly archived at the Phonogrammarchiv Wien in Vienna.

Kubik also performs as a clarinettist with a neo-traditional kwela Jazz Band from Malawi that has been performing throughout Europe and Brazil.

References
 Kubik, Gerhard, Theory of African Music 1994  
 Kubik, Gerhard, Zum Verstehen Afrikanischer Musik, Aufsätze, Reihe: Ethnologie: Forschung und Wissenschaft, Bd. 7, 2., aktualisierte und ergänzte Auflage, 2004, 448 S.  (in German language)
 Simon, Artur (Ed.), "Musik in Afrika", (Staatliche Museen) Berlin 1983 (in German language)
 A. Schmidhofer / D. Schüller (Hrsg.) For Gerhard Kubik Peter Lang, Frankfurt am Main 1994

External links
 Africa and The Blues: An Interview with Gerhard Kubik , Afropop Worldwide
 List of publications (until 1994)

Austrian ethnomusicologists
Living people
1934 births